Marion Edward is an Australian actress. She has appeared on stage in The Ballad of Angel's Alley, on TV in Snake Gully with Dad and Dave and on film. She was nominated for the 1981 AFI Award for Best Actress in a Supporting Role for her role in the film Roadgames.

References

External links

 cuttings on Marion Edward. actress, containing one or more cuttings from newspapers or journals at the National Library of Australia.

Australian television actresses
Australian film actresses